Zakharovsky is a rural locality (a khutor) in Sharashenskoye Rural Settlement, Alexeyevsky District, Volgograd Oblast, Russia. The population was 48 as of 2010.

Geography 
Zakharovsky is located on the right bank of the Kumylga River, 45 km southeast of Alexeyevskaya (the district's administrative centre) by road. Sharashensky is the nearest rural locality.

References 

Rural localities in Alexeyevsky District, Volgograd Oblast